Elaphrus laevigatus is a species of ground beetle in the subfamily Elaphrinae. It was described by John Lawrence LeConte in 1852.

References

Elaphrinae
Beetles described in 1852